Vicente García González (January 23, 1833 – March 4, 1888) was a General in the Cuban Ten Years' War (also known as the Great War) and later a Cuban President who was assassinated by the Spanish after the war.

Biography

Early years
García was born on January 23, 1833, in Las Tunas.

Career
In November 1877 President Estrada Palma is captured and imprisoned by the Spaniards. Maximo Gomez is offered the presidency, but he refuses. [Many believe this to be factor that ended the Ten Year War unfavorably for the rebels.] General Vicente García is named president of the Republic of Cuba.

Final years
On June 7, he left for Venezuela on the steamship Guadalquivir. He settled in Rio Chico, where he founded a cooperative with his family.  He continued to support the  new revolutionary outburst, and the Spanish assassinated him on March 4, 1888.

References

External links
  The Eminent Hero of Las Tunas
  Vicente García González: el León de Santa Rita
  Vicente García y González
  New York Times: Vicente Garcia Chosen Chief of The Insurgents 

Presidents of Cuba
People from Las Tunas (city)
Assassinated Cuban politicians
Assassinated military personnel
Cuban people murdered abroad
People murdered in Venezuela
1833 births
1886 deaths